"Six Ribbons" is a 1978 song credited to Australian musicians Jon English and Mario Millo. The song was written by Jon English and was included on the soundtrack of the Australian miniseries, Against the Wind.
 
The song was certified gold in Australia.

Track listing
 Australian 7" Single
Side A "Six Ribbons" - 3:15
Side B "Mary's Theme" - 4:00

 Scandinavian 7" Single
Side A "Six Ribbons" - 3:15
Side B "Against The Wind"	- 2:32

Charts

Weekly Charts
"Six Ribbons" entered the Kent Music Report on 5 December 1978, before peaking at number 5 in 1979. The song peaked at number 1 in Norway in December 1981.

Year-end charts

Cover Version
 In 2000, Donald Hall covered the song on his album Harp Moods. 
 In 2005, Black Majesty covered the song on their album, Silent Company. 
 In 2005, Green Carnation covered the song on their EP The Burden is Mine... Alone.  and in their 2006 limited edition studio album The Acoustic Verses. 
 In 2009, Ruiseart Alcorn covered the song on his album, The Ravenswing Years. 
 In 2012, Gavin Lockley covered the song on his album, Orchestral Songs of Australia. 
 In 2013, Didrik Solli-Tangen released a version of the song as a single from his album, The Journey. 
 In 2013,  covered the song on her album .
 In 2016 Billy Macro reinterpreted and released the song to coincide with the Netflix miniseries "For an eshay, with care".
 In 2016, Richard Clayderman covered the song on his album, A Musical Journey.
 In 2017, The Ten Tenors covered the song on their album, Wish You Were Here.

See also
 VG-lista 1964 to 1994

References

Jon English songs
1978 songs
1978 singles
2013 singles
Number-one singles in Norway
Polydor Records singles